"Pardonne-moi ce caprice d'enfant" (English translation: "Forgive me that childish vagary") is a song by French singer Mireille Mathieu, which was a summer hit in 1970.

It sold somewhere between 200,000 and 400,000 copies that year in France.

Track listings

Charts

References

External links 
 
 

1970 songs
1970 singles
Mireille Mathieu songs
Songs written by Patricia Carli